Cornisepta rostrata is a species of sea snail, a marine gastropod mollusk in the family Fissurellidae, the keyhole limpets.

Description
The height of the shell varies between 3.5 mm and 5 mm.

Distribution
This species occurs in the northeastern Atlantic Ocean and in the Mediterranean Sea at depths between 100 m and 2000 m.

References

 McLean J.H. & Geiger D.L. (1998). New genera and species having the Fissurisepta shell form, with a generic-level phylogenetic analysis (Gastropoda: Fissurellidae). Contributions in Science, Natural History Museum of Los Angeles County 475: 1–32

External links
  Serge GOFAS, Ángel A. LUQUE, Joan Daniel OLIVER,José TEMPLADO & Alberto SERRA (2021) - The Mollusca of Galicia Bank (NE Atlantic Ocean); European Journal of Taxonomy 785: 1–114
 

Fissurellidae
Gastropods described in 1862